The 2012–13 Arizona Wildcats men's basketball team represented the University of Arizona during the 2012–13 NCAA Division I men's basketball season.  They were led by fourth-year head coach Sean Miller and played home games at McKale Center in Tucson, Arizona as members of the Pac-12 Conference.

Seeded 6th in the West Region of the 2013 NCAA tournament, the team defeated (11) Belmont and (14) Harvard by a combined score of 40 points before losing 73–70 to (2) Ohio State in the Sweet Sixteen.

After starting the season undefeated in non-conference play the team went 12–6 in conference and fell to UCLA in the Pac-12 tournament semifinals.  The team's mid-season record of 14–0 was the second best start in program history since the 1931–32 team opened the season 16–0.

Arizona entered the season ranked 11th in the Coaches and 12th in the AP preseason polls, climbed to 3rd in both after going undefeated into January, and then fell to 20th (Coaches) and 21st (AP) just prior to the start of the NCAA tournament.

Before the season began Sean Miller and his staff recruited the nation's 3rd-ranked class of 2012 and brought in three well-regarded transfers, among them starting point guard Mark Lyons, who led the team in scoring with 15.6 points-per-game, including 24.3 points-per-game in NCAA tournament play.

Offseason

Recruiting Class

Incoming Transfers

Departures

Roster

Depth chart

Preseason

Summer Exhibition Tour
Practices began earlier than otherwise allowed by the NCAA in preparation for a six-day foreign tour to the Bahamas in August.  (NCAA rules allow teams to conduct 10 practices in preparation for a foreign tour.)  Although NCAA rules allow for foreign tours once every four years, the Bahamas tour was Arizona's first since 2006.  It was the seventh in program history.  The team won its games 136–66 and 99–57.

Red-Blue Game
Arizona's annual pre-season Red-Blue scrimmage took place at McKale Center on October 21, selling out for the second-straight season.  A half-time ceremony celebrated the 25-year anniversary of the 1987-88 basketball team, the first in program history to reach the Final Four.  The team's 35 victories remain the most in school history.  Members of the team present included Tucson-native Sean Elliott, Arizona's all-time leading scorer, with 2,555 career points; Steve Kerr, whose 57.8% three-point field-goal percentage in the 1987–88 season is the best in NCAA history (with a minimum of 100 shots made); and Anthony Cook, who recorded a program-best 278 career blocked-shots.

Schedule

|-
!colspan=9 style="background:#; color:white;"| Exhibition

|-
!colspan=9 style="background:#; color:white;"| Non-conference regular season

|-

|-

|-

|-

|-

|-

|-
!colspan=9 style="background:#;"|  Pac-12 regular season

|-

|-

|-

|-

|-
!colspan=9 style="background:#;"| Pac-12 Tournament

|-
!colspan=9 style="background:#;"| NCAA tournament

Awards
Solomon Hill
 2012 Diamond Head Classic MVP, All-Tournament Team
 Pac-12 All-Conference First Team
 USBWA All-District IX Team
 NABC All-District 20 First Team
Nick Johnson
 Honorable mention Pac-12 All-Defensive Team
Mark Lyons
 2012 Diamond Head Classic All-Tournament Team
 Pac-12 Player of the Week – January 21, 2013
 Pac-12 All-Conference First Team
 USBWA All-District IX Team
 NABC All-District 20 First Team
Kaleb Tarczewski
 Honorable mention Pac-12 All-Freshmen Team

Rankings

References

External links
 Arizona Wildcats men's basketball official website

Arizona Wildcats
Arizona Wildcats men's basketball seasons
Arizona
Arizona Wildcats
Arizona Wildcats